You Are My Sister is a four-track CD EP by Antony and the Johnsons, originally released in 2005 on Secretly Canadian Records and later in the UK and Europe by Rough Trade Records. The title track is taken from Antony and the Johnsons second studio album I Am a Bird Now and features co-lead vocals by Boy George. The remaining tracks were previously unreleased and are exclusive to the EP and its variants.

You Are My Sister reached #39 on the UK Top 40.

Track listing
Secretly Canadian CD
"You Are My Sister" – 4:00
"Poorest Ear" – 3:39
"Forest of Love" – 4:28
"Paddy's Gone" – 3:00

Rough Trade CD1
"You Are My Sister" – 4:00
"Poorest Ear" – 3:39

Rough Trade CD2
"You Are My Sister" – 4:00
"Forest of Love" – 4:28
"Paddy's Gone" – 3:00
"You Are My Sister" (Video) – 4:00

References

External links
 You Are My Sister at Discogs

2005 EPs
Antony and the Johnsons albums
Secretly Canadian EPs